The enzyme pyrethroid hydrolase (EC 3.1.1.88, pyrethroid-hydrolyzing carboxylesterase, pyrethroid-hydrolysing esterase, pyrethroid-hydrolyzing esterase, pyrethroid-selective esterase, pyrethroid-cleaving enzyme, permethrinase, PytH, EstP; systematic name pyrethroid-ester hydrolase) catalyses the reaction 

 trans-permethrin + H2O  (3-phenoxyphenyl)methanol + (1S,3R)-3-(2,2-dichloroethenyl)-2,2-dimethylcyclopropanecarboxylate

The enzyme is involved in degradation of pyrethroid pesticides.

References

External links 
 

EC 3.1.1